Steady Growth (April 4, 1976 – September 20, 1995) was a Canadian Thoroughbred Champion racehorse.

Background
Bred and raced by Bud Willmot's Kinghaven Farms, Steady Growth was out of the mare Crelita, a daughter of Crepello, winner of the 1957 Epsom Derby and 2,000 Guineas Stakes and the Leading sire in Great Britain and Ireland in 1969 and the Leading broodmare sire in Great Britain & Ireland in 1974. Steady Growth's sire was Briartic, who also sired the 1982 Queen's Plate winner, Son of Briartic.

Steady Growth was conditioned for racing from a base at Woodbine Racetrack in Toronto, Ontario, Canada, by American trainer John Tammaro, Jr.

Racing career
At age three, the colt won the 1979 Plate Trial Stakes and then Canada's most prestigious race, the Queen's Plate. A month later, he was shipped to Chicago's Arlington Park, where he defeated favorite Private Account in July's Arlington Classic. In August, Steady Growth was sent to New Jersey's Monmouth Park Racetrack to compete in the Monmouth Invitational Handicap, in which he finished second to Belmont Stakes winner Coastal.  A subsequent leg injury ended Steady Growth's racing career.

Stud career
He was retired to his owner's stud farm, where he sired thirteen stakes race winners. The best of his progeny was millionaire and 1989 Canadian Champion Older Horse Steady Power, a versatile runner at short and long distances whose wins included the Canadian and Manitoba Derbys, and the mile and three quarter Valedictory Handicap.

Steady Growth died of a heart attack on September 20, 1995, at Kinghaven Farms.

Pedigree

References

 Steady Growth's pedigree and partial racing stats

1976 racehorse births
1995 racehorse deaths
Racehorses bred in Ontario
Racehorses trained in Canada
King's Plate winners
Sovereign Award winners
Thoroughbred family 1-m